The DFS 230F was a military assault glider designed and built in Germany, by Gotha during World War II, to succeed the smaller DFS 230 which it was only related to by name.

Design and development
After initial operations using the DFS 230, it became obvious to the Wehrmacht that a larger more capable assault glider would be desirable. The DFS 230 F was designed to fulfil that need, but in an atmosphere of political intransigence.

The RLM (Reichsluftfahrtministerium - German Air Ministry), issued a directive in 1941 that no effort was to be spent designing a replacement for the rather dated DFS 230 assault glider, in its weight class. Ing. Hünerjäger of Gothaer Waggonfabrik (Gotha) believed that a great improvement on the DFS 230 could be achieved with an aircraft of similar dimensions designing what was named the DFS 230 V7 despite the ban. Gotha named their new design's prototype DFS 230 V7, production aircraft were to be designated DFS 230F-1, to deflect criticism for ignoring the ban on DFS 230 replacement.

Generally similar in layout and construction to the DFS 230A, the DFS 230F was a larger machine capable of carrying almost double the weight of cargo of the base-line DFS 230A-1, as well as seating up to 15 troops, as opposed to seven.

Construction of the DFS 230F was of welded-steel tube for the fuselage with wooden wings, control and tail surfaces, all fabric or plywood skinned. The fuselage was provided with side doors and a removable roof panel to allow loading of bulky items.

Control of the aircraft was by conventional elevator, ailerons, with large landing flaps to reduce landing speed and spoilers to adjust the approach angle. The undercarriage consisted of two main-wheels attached to the fuselage sides and a tail-skid.

Completed in 1943 the DFS 230 V7 had a cargo hold measuring  x  x , a vast improvement on the DFS 230. Access to the hold was via large hatches in the fuselage sides and roof of the rear fuselage.

Despite successful flight trials no orders for production aircraft were forthcoming and only the prototype was built.

Variants
Data from:'
(Gotha) DFS 230 V7
The prototype of an assault glider in the same class as the DFS 230 (an altogether new design)

(Gotha) DFS 230F-1
The proposed production version

Specifications (DFS 230 V7)

See also

References

Further reading
 

1940s military gliders
Vehicles introduced in 1943
1943 in Germany
1940s German military transport aircraft
Glider aircraft
World War II transport aircraft of Germany
DFS 230F